An Enemy of the State is a 1965 British TV series. Originally shown on BBC Two, it was written by Ken Hughes and directed by James Cellan Jones.

It ran for 6 episodes of 25 minutes.

Cast
Charles Tingwell as Harry Sutton
James Maxwell as Col. Rykov
Veronica Strong as Jennifer Sutton
Steven Berkoff as Defence Counsel

References

External links

1965 British television series debuts
1965 British television series endings